The women's individual all-around was a gymnastics event contested as part of the Gymnastics at the 1964 Summer Olympics programme at the Tokyo Metropolitan Gymnasium.

Results

The score for the individual all-around was a simple sum of each gymnast's preliminary scores from the four apparatus events.

References

Sources
 

Gymnastics at the 1964 Summer Olympics
1964 in women's gymnastics
Women's events at the 1964 Summer Olympics